Surakat Sado-Orsoy (Chechen : Эла Суракат) was the ruler of the Avar Khanate from the early 1360s (possibly 1362) to 1396 and the prince ("Ela") of the Princedom of Simsim from 1396 to the early 1430s. He was the brother of Khour II and also his tributary. In 1396, following his defeat during Timur's campaign in mountainous Dagestan, he was forced to flee Avaria along with his entire family for Simsir, where he rebuilt his power, and, after allying with the Kingdom of Georgia, carried out several successful attacks on Timur's army in the mountains of today's Chechnya.

Family 
 Khasi I
 Khour I
 Chakh
 Khasi II
 Khour II
 Makhama
 Surakat
 Bayr
 Sarka

Early life 
Not much is known about Surakat's early life. According to folklore, after Khour II was elected the ruler of the Durdzuks, he gathered an army, and first took control over two important cities during that time, Chir-Yurt and Khunzakh. He advanced south, defeated the warlord Mamai on the Terek River, and again during the siege of Tatar-Tup, leading to the withdrawal of Mongol troops in Chechen and Ingush lands, allowing Khour II to establish a Vainakh state in the year 1362: The Princedom of Simsir. Despite its legendary origins, this story seems to have a historical core, according to the Russian historian V. Kuznetsov, who notes that the attack showed the weakening of the Golden Horde in the North Caucasus. Therefore, the date 1362 is considered important by A. Tesaev for the Simsir Princedom, because of archaeological research that showed Golden Horde minted coins ceasing to exist on the territory of Chechnya following 1362 (after Khan Khidir's reign) and only resurfaced during the reign of Khan Tokhtamysh (an ally of Khour). Khour then gifted Khunzakh to his brother Surakat.

Early reign 
Having consolidated his rule over Khunzakh, Surakat rapidly expanded his state: First, he annexed neighboring lands, and then vassalized most of modern Dagestan, followed by today's northern Azerbaijan, including the city Shamakhi, all of whom payed tribute to him, while he himself payed tribute to his brother, Khour II, which, according to Tesayev, can be proven by archeological finds in the region.

Timurid invasion

Timurid invasion of Avaria 
Following his campaign in the Tsakhur Khanate, a Lezgin state, Timur invaded, ravaged and destroyed the Avar Khanate in 1396, expelling the Surak dynasty out of power, and forcing the Suraks to flee Avaria (see Timurid invasions of Simsir). Having heard of the death of his brother, Khour II, Surakat (called Surak Khan in Zafarnama), together with his son, Bayr, his remaining army and a convoy full of weapons and goods, fled to the devastated Simsir, where he rebuilt his power.

Surakat's counter campaign in Simsir 
Having arrived in Simsir, Surakat settled in the T'erloy region, in the Kirda fortress, where he established his residence, thus making it the so-to-say new capital of Princedom. In the same year, he established the Parsma settlement in Tusheti, Kingdom of Georgia, which served as a meeting place for discussing further actions against the Timurids in Simsir. These activities were carried out within the framework of the Vainakh-Georgian union. Combined, the forces of the Kingdom of Georgia and Simsir carried out several successful operations in the mountains of today's Chechnya, although it is important to note that Timur had already left the North Caucasus, leaving only garrisons of his army in the mountainous region behind. After a while, most of Timurid garrisons were destroyed by the Chechen-Georgian armies, after which the Surakat family left Kirda and eventually settled in Sado-upper Cheberla. The last Timurid garrison "Khan Khala" ("The Khan's fortress") was ousted by the son of Surakat, Sark on the Kerket pass, in south-eastern Chechnya.

Invasion of Shirvanshah 
In 1398, to restore the Surak rule in Khunzakh, the Kingdom of Georgia and Simsir launched a joint invasion into Shirvanshah, with the aim of expelling the pro-Timurid Darbandi dynasty, as well as restoring Surakats power in Dagestan. In 1399, Timur conducted a counter offensive against the two allied nations, pushing them beyond Hereti and Kakheti. A year later, in 1400, Surakat had to deal with another invasion of Timur to the south, although this time Timur withdrew his forces after being unable to penetrate into mountains, afterwhich he plundered and devastated the region Kartli.

With the death of Timur in 1405, the campaign in Shirvanshah continued, before it was shortly disturbed by the Turkoman invasions of Georgia in 1412, during which the Kingdom of Georgia and the Princedom of Simsir signed a ceasefire agreement with Shirvanshah in order to defeat the invaders.

In the early 1430s, one final large campaign was carried out by Surakat and Alexander I against Shirvan, which ended in a success for the allies, allowing the re-establishment of the Surak dynasty in Khunzakh, as well as severely weakening the darbandi dynasty.

Surakats descendants 
The eldest son of Surakat, Bayr, settled in Tanusi, becoming the regional ruler ("Nutsal") of the area formerly known as Sarir. According to chronicles, in the 15th century, the region Tusheti was ruled by a king who was known as "Bair". The second son of Surakat, Sark, settled in the Cheberloy region, south east Chechnya, where he later ousted the last remaining Timurid garrison in Chechnya, known as the "Khan Kala" garrison, meaning "the Khans fortress".

Surak's tax collector, Birach, stayed in T'erloy, and later had a son, Biych'cha, who would play a crucial role in the civil war following Surak's death.

Civil war in Simsim 
The death of Surakat was followed by a brutal civil war lasting decades, in which Pula "Vokhkal" (Pula "The Great"), a ruler of a small region in western Chechnya and the son of the former tax collector of Surakat, Biych'cha, fought for power in Vaynakh lands. Other parties, such as Argun and Malkhista, also took part in the conflict, although they only played a minor role. This eventually caused the collapse of Simsim, afterwhich the lands were known as "Vilayat Chachan", "Chadzhan" or "Dzheydzhev".
Foreign powers such as the Gazikumukh Shamkhalate also invaded former Simsim lands, establishing control over an area that would later be known as "Ichkeria" in the Kipchak language.
In 1454, the Circassians, known as "Kassogs" in medieval sources, invaded and occupied the Northwestern plain of today's Chechnya and Ingushetia. Pula, who formed an alliance with the former ruler of the principality of Tarki, Akhmer, retreated into the mountains, and after a short campaign eventually managed to drive out the Circassians.
The civil war came to an end, and in the second half of the 15th century, the Chechen elders agreed on a new form of government, which was ruled by a "Vokhka Ela" (Grand Duke). Pula became the new ruler of most of the former Simsim lands, and before his death, he gave the title of Vokhka Ela to his son-in-law, Akhmer.

See also 

 Timurid invasions of Simsir
 Khour II

References 

Chechen people
Chechen politicians
Lists of 15th-century people
15th-century rulers
14th-century rulers